Victor Evans (born January 20, 1978), better known by his stage name Ruste Juxx, is an American rapper.

He is originally from Crown Heights, Brooklyn. He was a protege of Sean Price, and a frequent guest rapper on Duck Down Music recordings. His first appearance was on the song "Magnum Force" off Heltah Skeltah's Magnum Force.

He released his debut album, Indestructible, in 2008 through Duck Down Music. It was executive produced by Sean Price, and producers included Marco Polo and Black Milk. He subsequently collaborated with Marco Polo on the 2010 album The Exxecution.

Discography

Studio albums
 Indestructible (2008)
 The Exxecution (2010) (with Marco Polo)
 Adamantine (2010)
 Hardbodie Hip Hop (2012) (with Kyo Itachi)
 V.I.C. (2012) (with The Arcitype)
 Ready to Juxx (2013) (with VSTheBest)
 Def by Stereo (2016) (with Beat Bruisers and Pawz One)
 Meteorite (2016) (with Kyo Itachi)
 International Juxx (2017)
 Jake and the Juxxman (2018) (with Jake Palumbo)
 King of Crime Heights (2018) (with Raticus)
 Magma (2019) (with Tone Spliff)
 Culturally Rich (2019)
 Sulfuric Acid (2020) (with Zealot of FWM)
 James Brown of the Underground (2020) (with Amadeus 360 The Beat King)

Mixtapes
 Reign of Destruction (2005)

EPs
 Black Son Rise (2015) (with Omen44 and Noriq)

Singles
 "Nobody" / "Rearview" (2010)
 "Ginsu-Sharp" (2018)
 "One Day Baby (Prod. TooBusy)'" (2020)
 "Down (Prod. TooBusy)'" (2020)
 "One For The Team (Prod. TooBusy)" (2021)

Guest appearances
 Heltah Skeltah - "Magnum Force" from Magnum Force (1998)
 Representativz - "Lessons 2 Learn" from Angels of Death (1999)
 Sean Price - "Spliff n Wessun" and "Slap Boxing" from Monkey Barz (2005)
 Sean Price - "Cardiac" from Jesus Price Supastar (2007)
 Heltah Skeltah - "So Damn Tuff" from D.I.R.T. (Da Incredible Rap Team) (2008)
 Sean Price - "Price & Shining Armor" from Mic Tyson (2012)
 Termanology - "Get Off the Ground (DJ Premier Mix)" from Term Brady - EP (2015)
 Sean Price - "Ape in His Apex" from Imperius Rex (2017)

References

External links
 

1978 births
African-American male rappers
Living people
People from Crown Heights, Brooklyn
Rappers from Brooklyn
Underground rappers
20th-century American rappers
20th-century American male musicians
20th-century African-American musicians
21st-century African-American people